Sloboda is a rural locality (a village) in Prigorodnoye Rural Settlement, Sokolsky District, Vologda Oblast, Russia. The population was 32 as of 2002.

Geography 
The distance to Sokol is 9 km, to Litega is 6 km. Boriskovo is the nearest rural locality.

References 

Rural localities in Sokolsky District, Vologda Oblast